Liudmila Kalinchik (born 23 July 1982) is a retired Belarusian biathlete. She represented Belarus at the 2010 Winter Olympics in Vancouver and at the 2014 Winter Olympics in Sochi.

References

External links

1982 births
Belarusian female biathletes
Olympic biathletes of Belarus
Biathletes at the 2010 Winter Olympics
Biathletes at the 2014 Winter Olympics
Living people
Biathlon World Championships medalists